CuSil is a tradename for an alloy of 72% silver and 28% copper (± 1%) marketed by Morgan Advanced Materials. It is a eutectic alloy primarily used for vacuum brazing. CuSil should not be confused with the similarly named Cusil-ABA, which has a different composition (Ag – 63.0%, Cu – 35.25%, Ti – 1.75%)

References

Precious metal alloys
Brazing and soldering